In Canadian folklore, Memphre is a lake monster said to live in Lake Memphremagog, a fresh water glacial lake located between Newport, Vermont, United States and Magog, Quebec, Canada.

Background

It was formed by melting glaciers 10,000 years ago, during the last ice-age. The lake freezes over each winter, often becoming up to a metre (three feet) thick.

History
Memphre is often described as much like the Loch Ness Monster. While the existence of Memphre and most other lake monsters is treated skeptically by the scientific community, reports of sightings persist, with the last in 2005.

Coin
In August 2011, an artistic impression of Memphre was featured on a coloured Canadian quarter.

See also 
 Ogopogo, reported to live in Okanagan Lake, in British Columbia, Canada
 Manipogo, said to live in Lake Manitoba, Manitoba
 Champ, reported to live in Lake Champlain, between New York, Vermont and Quebec
 Seelkee, said to live in the swamps of what is now Chilliwack, in British Columbia

References

External links 
The International Dracontology Society of Lake Memphremagog

Canadian folklore
Canadian legendary creatures
Water monsters